Nicholas Gage (born Nikolaos Gatzoyiannis; ; July 23, 1939) is a Greek-born American author and investigative journalist.

Early life
Nicholas Gage (original name, Nikos Gatzoyiannis) was born in 1939 in Lia, a village in northwestern Greece. Gage spent his early years with his mother, Eleni, and four older sisters. His father, Christos, had left to find work in the United States. After World War II, Eleni and her children found themselves caught in the Greek Civil War between the communists and the Royalists. In 1947, Communist fighters gained control of Lia. When the communists began to retreat in the spring of 1948, they took some children with them. Fearing that her children would be sent to communist countries, Eleni made arrangements for her family to flee. Gage and three of his sisters escaped, but his mother and one of his sisters were left behind. The Communists arrested Eleni, who was put on trial and executed. Eventually, Gage and his sisters joined their father in the United States.

Career
He is most known for two books of autobiographical memoirs, the best-selling Eleni (1983) and A Place for Us (1989). Eleni describes the life of his family in Greece during the Second World War and Greek Civil War. Gage's mother, Eleni, was executed for arranging the escape of her children from their Communist-occupied village.  Decades later, as an adult, Gage sought out those responsible for her death.

A Place for Us relates the Gage family's experiences as immigrants in 1950s America in the city of Worcester, Massachusetts. In 1964, Gage earned a master's degree from the Columbia University Graduate School of Journalism.

In 1985, Eleni was made into a feature film starring John Malkovich as Gage.  In 1987, Eleni was cited by Ronald Reagan as an inspiration for his summit meetings to end the arms race with the Soviet Union.

Eleni has been lauded with many reviews; "If Eleni were fiction, it would bear the mark of genius...a devoted and brilliant achievement." __ The New York Review of Books

"A story assigned by fate... minutely observed and eloquently rendered.' __ The New York Times Book Review

"This Greek tragedy in its most poignant sense, a series of adversities that is so overwhelming and appalling that the reader will feel as if his heart is being torn out, page by page." __ San Diego Union

"Her life and death glow with dignity and humanity...Through Eleni's love and sacrifices for her children, we glimpse a more profound reality that rises above the shameful record of brutality and inquisition inflicted by men upon other men and women in the name of causes and crusades. All of their legions and philosophies are not this woman's soul." __ Chicago Tribune

Gage first achieved fame as an investigative reporter for The Wall Street Journal and The New York Times.  His acclaimed coverage of the Mafia led to two best-selling books: The Mafia Is Not An Equal Opportunity Employer and Mafia, U.S.A.

He was also instrumental in exposing corruption in the past of Vice President Spiro Agnew, which led to Agnew's resignation.  During the Watergate scandal, Gage was the first reporter to hear any of the Nixon tapes.  His experiences as a reporter were the basis for the 1977 CBS television show The Andros Targets. In 1985, the company had inked an overall production deal with Paramount Pictures, whereas Gage would develop offices for Paramount's New York headquarters.

Gage was an Executive Producer of The Godfather Part III, co-writing an early draft of the script with Mario Puzo.  The movie was nominated for seven Golden Globe Awards and seven Academy Awards.

His book Eleni, which has been translated into 32 languages, was awarded first prize by the Royal Society of Literature of Great Britain and was nominated in the category of best biography by the National Book Critics Circle.

His most recent book is Greek Fire: The Story of Maria Callas and Aristotle Onassis, an account of the relationship between Aristotle Onassis and opera singer Maria Callas, which was published by Alfred A. Knopf in 2000.

Gage is the honorary president of the World of Epirotes and a recipient of The International Center in New York's Award of Excellence. He continues to speak throughout the world and writes for such publications as The New York Times and Vanity Fair.

Personal life
Gage and his wife, Joan, live in North Grafton, Massachusetts. He is the father of three children: Christos, Eleni, and Marina.

List of published works

Books 
 Eleni – ;
 A Place for Us – ;
 The Bourlotas fortune – ;
 Hellas: A Portrait of Greece – ;
 Greece: Land of Light – ;
 Greek Fire: The Story of Maria Callas and Aristotle Onassis – .
  The Teacher Who Changed My Life

Magazine articles 
 "The Last Onassis", Vanity Fair, May 2005 (about Athina Onassis de Miranda, granddaughter of Aristotle Onassis)

References

Further reading 
 Ronald Reagan, December 10, 1987, Address to the Nation on the Soviet-United States Summit Meeting
 Arthur Gelb. "City Room."  Berkeley Publishing Group, 2003.

External links 
 Biography and an Interview at the Worcester Writers' Project

1939 births
Living people
People from Filiates
American investigative journalists
American male non-fiction writers
Columbia University Graduate School of Journalism alumni
Greek emigrants to the United States
Writers from Worcester, Massachusetts
American writers of Greek descent